Burj Pukhta or Burj Pukta, is a village in Phillaur tehsil of Jalandhar district of Punjab State, India. It is located 3.3 km away from Nagar, 47.7 km from Jalandhar and 115 km from state capital Chandigarh. Burj Pukhta has postal head office in Phillaur which is 4.5 km away from the village. The village is administrated by a sarpanch who is an elected representative of village as per Panchayati raj (India).

Caste 
The village has schedule caste (SC) constitutes 47.84% of total population of the village and it doesn't have any Schedule Tribe (ST) population.

Transport

Rail 
Phillaur Junction is the nearest train station however, Bhatian Railway Station is 10.5 km away from the village.

Air 
The nearest domestic airport is located 35 km away in Ludhiana and the nearest international airport is located in Chandigarh also Sri Guru Ram Dass Jee International Airport is the second nearest airport which is 142 km away in Amritsar.

References 

Villages in Jalandhar district
Villages in Phillaur tehsil